The 2016–17 Tanzanian Premier League is the 52nd season of top-tier football in Tanzania. The season started on 20 August 2016 and concluded on 20 May 2017.

League table

References

Tanzanian Premier League
Tanzanian Premier League
Tanzanian Premier League
Tanzania